Fotbal Club Inter Stars 2020 Sibiu , commonly known as FC Inter Sibiu or Inter Sibiu, is a Romanian amateur football team based in the city of Sibiu, Sibiu County, which competes in the Liga IV, the fourth tier of the Romanian league system.

The club was originally founded in 1968 as Independența Sibiu, and managed important performances during the communist period. In the years preceding the Romanian Revolution, the club started to become associated with Nicu Ceaușescu, the youngest child of dictator Nicolae Ceaușescu. Inter continued to also have results during the 1990s, but eventually went bankrupt in 2000.

In 2020, Inter Sibiu was refounded and commenced play in the fourth division.

History

First years and Nicu Ceaușescu support (1968–1990)
FC Inter Sibiu was founded in the summer of 1968, under the name of Independența Sibiu. The club was financially supported by Independența Factory (a metallurgical machinery manufacturer) and was known for years as the football club of Terezian neighborhood of Sibiu, playing for the first time in the third tier in 1969, after won the 1968–69 Sibiu County Championship and the promotion play-off against the champion of Covasna County, Carpați Covasna (2–0 at Sibiu and  2–1 at Covasna). Until 1982, Independența oscillated between the third and fourth tier, than started to have a constant appearance at the level of Divizia C, under the management of Mihai Găldean, factory's chairman. At that time (1982), the historical and most representative football club of Sibiu was Șoimii Sibiu, former top-flight member and an important team of Divizia B.

After 1982, for the next three seasons Independența was a middle-table team, ranking between fourth and seventh place. In the summer of 1985, the club changed its name from FC Independența Sibiu to AS Inter Sibiu, and although some claimed that the name was inspired by Inter Milano, in fact was a juxtaposition of letters, In (Independența) and Ter (Terezian). However, some inspiration related to Inter Milano existed, because the team played in blue kits, with black vertical lines. After only one year, Inter promoted to Divizia B, after it was ranked first in the third tier, at the end of an intense fight against Electromureș Târgu Mureș (both teams obtaining 61 points).

Summer of 1986 was a summer of change in the history of football from Sibiu, thus the promotion of Inter was correlated with an unnexpected relegation of Șoimii Sibiu fact that generated a big change, Șoimii left Municipal Stadium and Inter came in. In the same summer, AS Inter Sibiu was renamed as FC Inter Sibiu, name that will obtain the best results of the local football, in the next years, also the colors changed from blue and black to bleu and blue. In the first season, Inter (with Marian Bondrea and Viorel Hizo as coaches and an important contingent of players from Șoimii) managed to save from relegation, after it was ranked 10th of 18. In the next season, the team promoted after won its series (seven points over 2nd place, Jiul Petroșani). 1987–88 season is in fact the period when the controversy started to surround "the blue and blacks", because with some rounds before the end of the season, son of Nicolae and Elena Ceaușescu, Nicu Ceauşescu (which was first secretary of Romanian Communist Party) started to be involved in the team's destiny. Legend of the club, Viorel Hizo, spoke about this issue a few years ago: "In 1984 I was brought to Inter Sibiu, where I stayed until 1991. I was the assistant of Bondrea and Titi Ardeleanu, but also head coach in two periods. Nicu Ceaușescu came when we were already almost promoted to Divizia A, we had a few points ahead of Petroșani, so he didn't help us. Nicu Ceaușescu helped us financially, especially with the transfers, because we took good footballers, without paying. When he came to the team, he said: “Don't imagine that I will win your matches. But I can help you make a team, so we don't make fun of each other in the Divizia A, but I want something, you would make me the happiest if you beat Steaua București and Dinamo București, but also FC Olt."

Inter was ranked eleventh (1988–89) and sixth (1989–90) in its first seasons spent in the top-flight, then Nicu Ceauşescu left the club, after the Romanian Revolution.

From Balkans Cup to bankruptcy (1990–2000)

In the first part of the 1990s, Inter remained a strong team, even without the support of Nicu Ceaușescu, reaching its peak in 1991, when it obtained the best rank in the history of the club (4th place) and won 1–0 (on aggregate) the Balkans Cup, in a final against Budućnost Titograd, goal scored by Lucian Cotora. After 1991, Inter started to obtain only rankings in the middle of the league table, then, at the end of the 1995–96 season, relegated back in the second division, after 8 years spent in the top-flight of the Romanian football league system.

Back in the Divizia B, Inter almost relegated again in the first season after a weak ranking, 15th of 18, only one point over the first relegating place, occupied by Apulum Alba Iulia. In the next seasons Inter remained a middle-table team: 12th of 18 (1997–98), 11th of 18 (1998–99) and 9th of 18 (1999–2000, then, the club was dissolved in the first part of the 2000–01 edition, due to financial problems, to the disappointment of its supporters.

Rebirth (2021–present)
In 2001, at short period after Inter's bankruptcy, Șoimii Sibiu was dissolved, as well, the football from the Transylvanian city reaching a deep coma. First club that continued the football tradition was FC Sibiu, but dissolved after only 4 years. In the same year appeared Voința Sibiu, club that reached the top-flight in 2011, but relegated after only one season, then went bankruptcy, as well. After three years of fog, a new project appeared, FC Hermannstadt, club that achieved Liga I promotion in 2018 and resisted three years in the top-flight before relegating.

Inter was refounded in 2020, after 20 years of absence, at the initiative of Teodor Birț, first president of FC Hermannstadt, the man who led the club from Liga IV to Liga I.

Grounds

The club plays its home matches on Păltiniș Stadium in Rășinari, with a capacity of 300 seats. Between 1982 and 1986, Inter Sibiu played its home matches on Independența Stadium in Terezian neighborhood, Sibiu. After the 1986 promotion to Divizia B, interiștii started to play their home matches on Municipal Stadium, in Sub Arini Park zone, Sibiu.

Honours

Domestic
Liga I:
 Best finish in Liga I: 4th (1990–91)

Liga II:
Winners (1): 1987–88

Liga III:
Winners (1): 1985–86

Liga IV – Sibiu County
Winners (5): 1968–69, 1973–74, 1980–81, 1981–82, 2021–22
Runners-up (1): 2020–21

Continental
Balkans Cup:
Winners (1): 1990–91

Other performances 
 Appearances in Liga I: 8

Players

First team squad

Out on loan

Club officials

Board of directors

Current technical staff

League history

Notable former players

  Zoltan Ritli
  Adrian Damian
  Marius Baciu
  Mihail Majearu
  Florin Cotora
  Lucian Cotora
  Adrian Blid
  Gheorghe Mihali
  Radu Niculescu
  Marius Predatu
  Răzvan Toboşaru
  Bogdan Bănuță 
  Cristian Sava
  Adrian Văsâi
  Dorinel Munteanu
  Ovidiu Tâlvan
  Constantin Lazăr
  Ovidiu Maier
  Cezar Zamfir
  Marius Szeghedi
  Marian Mărgărit
  Cătălin Popa
  Bogdan Bucur
  Corneliu Szeghedi
  Dorin Zotincă
  Mircea Bolba
  Lucian Burchel
  Alexandru Szenes
  Neculai Alexa
  Ionel Fulga
  Cornel Cașolțan
  Marius Pistol
  Bogdan Mara
  Benonie Popescu
  Radu Neguț
  Alex Zotincă
  Claudiu Moldovan
  Cristian Lazăr

Notable former managers

  Marian Bondrea
  Viorel Hizo
  Florin Halagian
  Cornel Țălnar
  Silviu Ștefănescu
  Ștefan Coidum
  Jean Gavrilă
  Gheorghe Țurlea
  Constantin Ardeleanu
  Ștefan Dorian

References

External links
 
 FC Inter Sibiu at frf-ajf.ro

Association football clubs established in 1968
Football clubs in Sibiu County
Sibiu
Liga III clubs
1968 establishments in Romania